also known by  and his Chinese style name , was a bureaucrat of Ryukyu Kingdom.

King Shō Boku dispatched a gratitude envoy for his accession to Edo, Japan in 1752. They sailed back in the next year.

He served as a member of Sanshikan from 1755 to 1759.

References

1759 deaths
Ueekata
Sanshikan
People of the Ryukyu Kingdom
Ryukyuan people
18th-century Ryukyuan people